Kargakekeç is a village in the District of Sarıçam, Adana Province, Turkey.

References

Villages in Sarıçam District